Senator Rose may refer to:

Daniel Rose (politician) (1772–1833), Maine State Senate
Isaiah Rose (1843–1916), Ohio State Senate
John A. Rose (born 1940), Kentucky State Senate
John B. Rose (1875–1949), New York State Senate
Leonard John Rose (1827–1899), California State Senate
Paul Rose (American politician) (fl. 2010s), Tennessee State Senate

See also
Senator Rosa (disambiguation)